Tomasz 'Tomek' Iwan (born 12 June 1971) is a Polish former professional footballer who played for a number of clubs throughout Europe, such as Olimpia Poznań, ŁKS Łódź, Warta Poznań and Lech Poznań in Poland, Roda JC, Feyenoord, PSV and RBC Roosendaal in the Netherlands, Trabzonspor in Turkey and Austria Wien and Admira Wacker in Austria. He also represented the Polish national side, earning 40 caps.

External links
 Player profile at 90minut.pl
 CV - Tomek Iwan
 www.psvweb.nl profile

1971 births
Living people
Sportspeople from Słupsk
Polish footballers
Poland international footballers
ŁKS Łódź players
Warta Poznań players
Roda JC Kerkrade players
Feyenoord players
PSV Eindhoven players
Trabzonspor footballers
RBC Roosendaal players
FK Austria Wien players
Ekstraklasa players
Eredivisie players
Austrian Football Bundesliga players
Polish expatriate footballers
Expatriate footballers in the Netherlands
Polish expatriate sportspeople in the Netherlands
Expatriate footballers in Turkey
Polish expatriate sportspeople in Turkey
Expatriate footballers in Austria
Polish expatriate sportspeople in Austria
Lech Poznań players
Association football midfielders